Katharina Bosse (born 1968) is a Finnish photographer.

Her work is included in the collections of the Museum of Fine Arts Houston, the Centre Pompidou, Paris, and the Museum of Modern Art, New York.

References

Living people
1968 births
20th-century Finnish women artists
20th-century Finnish photographers
21st-century Finnish women artists
21st-century Finnish photographers
20th-century women photographers
21st-century women photographers